Thitiphan Puangchan (born 1 September 1993) is a Thai professional footballer who plays as a midfielder for Thai League 1 club Bangkok United, and the Thailand national team.

Personal life
Thitiphan is the son of Pairote Puangchan, who is a former national team player.

Style of play
Early in his career with Muangthong United, Thitiphan usually played right-back. Now Thitiphan usually plays in central midfielder. A hardworking box-to-box player. He is known for his pace, work-rate and stamina, create attacking chances from midfield. He also possess good technical, as well as notable defensive attributes.

International statistics

International goals

Thailand U-23

Thailand
Scores and results list Thailand's goal tally first.

Honours

Club
Muangthong United
 Thai League 1 (1): 2012

Chiangrai United
 Thai FA Cup (1): 2017

BG Pathum United
 Thai League 1 (1): 2020–21

International
Thailand U-19
 AFF U-19 Youth Championship (1): 2011

Thailand U-23
 Sea Games  Gold Medal (2): 2013, 2015

Thailand
 King's Cup (1): 2017
 AFF Championship (1): 2020

References

External links

Puangchan, Thitiphan
Living people
Thitiphan Puangchan
Thitiphan Puangchan
Association football midfielders
Thitiphan Puangchan
Thitiphan Puangchan
Thitiphan Puangchan
Thitiphan Puangchan
Thitiphan Puangchan
Thitiphan Puangchan
Thitiphan Puangchan
Thitiphan Puangchan
Thitiphan Puangchan
Southeast Asian Games medalists in football
2019 AFC Asian Cup players
Thitiphan Puangchan
Competitors at the 2013 Southeast Asian Games
Competitors at the 2015 Southeast Asian Games
Expatriate footballers in Japan
Thitiphan Puangchan